Watford Junction is a railway station that serves Watford, Hertfordshire. The station is on the West Coast Main Line (WCML), 17 miles 34 chains from London Euston and the Abbey Line, a branch line to St Albans. Journeys to London take between 16 and 52 minutes depending on the service used: shorter times on fast non-stop trains and slower on the stopping Watford DC line services. The station is a major hub for local bus services and the connecting station for buses to Warner Bros. Studio Tour London – The Making of Harry Potter. The station is located north of a viaduct over the Colne valley and immediately south of Watford Tunnel.

History

The first railway station to open in Watford was situated on the north side of St Albans Road, approximately  further up the line from the present-day station. The station provided first and second-class waiting rooms, a departure yard, a carriage shed and engine house. The platforms were situated in a deep cutting which was accessed via a staircase. The old station closed when it was replaced by a new, larger station, which opened on 5 May 1858. The new Watford Junction station was located south of St Albans Road in order to accommodate the newly constructed branch line to St Albans. The junction station was rebuilt in 1909, and was extensively redeveloped in the 1980s. The Grade-II-listed Old Station House still stands at 147A St Albans Road, a rare surviving example of architecture from the beginning of the railway age, and today the building is occupied by a second-hand car dealership.

In 1862, the Watford and Rickmansworth Railway opened a route from Watford to Rickmansworth (Church Street). Now mostly closed, this route began by running south and west to a more central station on Watford's High Street, which remains in use.

From 1846, the L&BR was absorbed into the London and North Western Railway (LNWR) and Watford Junction was now run by this large, ambitious company. Seeking to compete with local buses and trams, the LNWR built an additional suburban line from Euston to Watford in the early years of the 20th century, now known as the Watford DC Line. This veered away from the main line at Bushey to loop around Watford to pass through the High Street station. A second suburban branch line was also built from High Street west towards Croxley Green to serve new housing developments in that area. Both branches were later electrified as part of this improvement plan, on the same DC three-rail system. The Rickmansworth branch was connected to the Main Line via two through platforms with a junction to the north; these platforms have since been partly built over and their remaining southern sections form part of the present DC lines terminus. At one time tube-style trains were used on the branches to counter the low voltage caused by the lack of a sub-station near Rickmansworth.

The Bakerloo line was extended to Watford Junction in 1917, giving a shared service north of Willesden Junction with the main line electric trains which served  and Broad Street stations. However, since 1982 the line north of  has only been served by what is now the London Overground service from Euston station; this service uses these DC lines for its "all stations" local service.

Oyster Card capability was extended to this station on 11 November 2007 on both the London Overground and Southern. It was extended to London Midland services on 18 November 2007. However, the station is outside London fare zones 1–9 and special fares apply.

With the electrification of the entire West London Line in the 1990s, it became practical to run services from Watford Junction to Clapham Junction, allowing passengers to cross London without changing trains. Southern rail operated an hourly service from Milton Keynes, now starting from Watford Junction, to East Croydon with connections to Brighton and Gatwick.

There is a well known expression "North of Watford" which is used to mean the north of England, especially a place remote from London. The alternative variant phrase "North of Watford Junction" was used with similar meaning in the past, referring to Watford Junction railway station. The expression reflects the station's position as the last urban stop on the main railway line out of London to the north of England. In more recent years it has been suggested that the phrase references Watford Gap services on the M1, however the original saying was in existence well before its opening in 1959.

Motive power depot
The LNWR built a locomotive depot at the station in 1856, which was replaced by a larger building in 1872, and further enlarged in 1890. It was closed by British Railways in March 1965.

Redevelopment

In 1984 the Victorian station buildings were demolished and the station was rebuilt in a modern architectural style with a travel centre and a large office block above the station which is occupied by the lorry and bus manufacturing company Iveco. Some 19th-century waiting rooms survived, but were finally demolished in 1987. To enlarge the car park and provide more space, the St. Albans branch line was realigned northwards, with the original St. Albans platforms becoming a single terminating bay now mostly used by Southern services.

The station forecourt was extensively remodelled in 2013; the horseshoe-shaped taxi rank was moved to the side of the building, creating a larger pedestrian area in front of the station entrance, and the bus station enlarged. Due to problems with the road layout, buses were unable to gain access to the bus station, and there were problems with access to the relocated car park. London Northwestern Railway are considering revising the design.

Further redevelopment of the station and its surroundings is planned for the next 10 years. They may be delayed because the redevelopment of Watford Junction has been placed within the Pre-Qualification pool of proposed schemes by the Department for Transport.

Accidents and incidents

1954 accident

On 3 February 1954, an express passenger train became derailed in Watford Tunnel due to a broken rail. The last three carriages became divided from the train as it entered the station. One of them ended up on the platform. A passing express passenger train grazed the wreckage but only received minor damage. Fifteen people were injured.

1975 accident

On 23 January 1975, an express train from Manchester to Euston derailed just south of Watford Junction after striking some stillages that had fallen on to the track. It then collided with a sleeper service from Euston to Glasgow. The driver of the Manchester train was killed, and eight passengers and three railway staff injured. The stillages had fallen from a Ford company goods train that had passed the station a few minutes earlier, conveying car parts from Dagenham to Halewood. Although the wagons of the goods train were sealed on departure from Dagenham, three were found to have open doors when the train was inspected after the accident.

1996 accident

In August 1996, a Class 321 passenger train operated by Network SouthEast passed a signal at danger. An empty Class 321 coaching stock train collided with the stationary passenger train approximately 700 m south of Watford Junction.

2014 incident
The RAIB investigated the incident, and concluded that the lineside cabinet door had not been properly secured during maintenance work the previous night. The investigation also noted that the maintenance crew were likely suffering from fatigue due to a pattern of consistent night-shift work, regular overtime, and short-term sleep deprivation.

2016 accident
On 16 September 2016, Class 350 electric multiple unit  350 264 collided with a landslide, caused by heavy rain the previous night, at the entrance of the Watford Tunnel and derailed. Class 350 unit 350 233 then collided with the derailed train. Two injuries were reported, and trains were disrupted for three days.

Station masters

W. Austin 1852 - 1880
Alfred Willis Briggs 1883 - 1885 (formerly station master at Banbury)
Edward Brook 1885 - 1889
George Tuley 1889 - 1898 (afterwards station master at Rugby)
Frederick Arthur Hawkins 1898 - 1902 (afterwards station master at Rugby)
William Hedge 1902 - 1908  (afterwards station master at Rugby)
James Glass 1908 - 1914
E.W. Cross 1914 - 1929
S. Bunker 1929 - ???? (formerly station master at Wembley (for 3 weeks))
T. Finch ???? - 1943 (afterwards station master at Birmingham New Street)
G. H. Rogers 1943 - 1944 (afterwards station master at Nottingham)
Frank Shelley 1944 - 1946 (afterwards station master at Carlisle)
F.T. Hawkins 1946 - 1947
John Ellwood 1947 - 1951 (formerly station master Barrow in Furness)
A. Stabler ca. 1962 - 1965
J. Bates 1965 - ???? (formerly station master at Bricket Wood)

Services

The station is staffed by dispatch staff for London Northwestern Railway, it is the south-most and the nearest station to London that is managed by London Northwestern Railway within its network; London Overground also maintain a traincrew depot here. London Overground use only platforms 1-4 but also have a link onto platform 6 to be used for stock movements via the WCML to/from London Euston.

London Overground operate services on the Watford DC line using Class 710 EMUs.
 4tph to London Euston
Southern operate services onto the West London Line using Class 377 EMUs.
 1tph to East Croydon
 2tpd to Hemel Hempstead
London Northwestern Railway operate services on the West Coast Main Line and the Abbey Line using both Class 350 and Class 319 EMUs.
 7 tph to London Euston
 2 tph to Tring
 2 tph to Milton Keynes Central
 2 tph to Birmingham New Street
 1 tph to Crewe
 1 tph to St Albans Abbey
Avanti West Coast operates intercity services on the West Coast Main Line using tilting Class 390 EMUs and Class 221 DEMUs. Southbound trains do not allow passengers to board and northbound trains do not allow passengers to depart at Watford Junction, therefore prohibiting travel to/from London Euston on these services. Extra services call here during the peak.
 1tp2h to Edinburgh Waverley
 5tpd to Glasgow Central
 2tpd to Blackpool North
Caledonian Sleeper operates sleeper services to Scotland along the West Coast Main Line. As with Avanti West Coast's services, these are not able to be used for travel to/from London Euston. The southbound trains from the Highlands does not call at Watford Junction.
 1tpd to  &

Platforms

Platform Usage:

Platforms 1-4: Bay platforms for the three trains per hour London Overground Service (Watford DC Line) to London Euston calling at all stations.
(Platform 5 was used by the Bakerloo line services of the London Underground until 1982, and removed as part of the subsequent major rebuild)
Platform 6 (Down Fast): For the hourly Avanti West Coast service to Birmingham New Street, hourly Avanti West Coast service to Glasgow Central or Edinburgh (alternating), and fast London Northwestern Railway services northbound.
Platform 7 (Up Fast): For fast London Northwestern Railway services to London Euston and Avanti services only to set down.
Platform 8 (Down Slow): For slow and semi-fast London Northwestern Railway services northbound and limited Southern services to Hemel Hempstead.
Platform 9 (Up Slow): For slow, semi-fast and fast London Northwestern Railway services to London Euston, and Southern services to East Croydon via Kensington Olympia, Selhurst, Balham and Clapham Junction.
Platform 10: For terminating Southern services to and from Kensington Olympia and Clapham Junction. There are additional terminating services to and from East Croydon, Balham, Selhurst and South Croydon on weekdays and Saturdays. London Northwestern Railway operate 2 trains on weekdays at 07:55 and 08:15 to London Euston in the morning, whilst one train terminates from London Euston at 17:55.
Platform 11: Used for the service every 45 minutes to St Albans Abbey.

Connections
Local buses run to destinations including Heathrow Airport, Stanmore, Uxbridge and Brent Cross in London, Amersham, Chesham and High Wycombe in Buckinghamshire, Hatfield, Harpenden and Hertford in Hertfordshire, Luton Airport in Bedfordshire and Harlow in Essex.

Specific routes include London bus routes 142, 258 and non-London Arriva Shires & Essex routes 8, 10, 320, 321 and 520 as well as other Intalink routes 306 (school journeys), 352, 501, 635, W1, W2, W3, W4, W20 and W30.

The Warner Bros. Studio Tour London – The Making of Harry Potter shuttle bus route 311 also leaves from the station forecourt.

Green Line route 724 stops in the station forecourt. It runs directly to St Albans and Harlow from stop 5 and to Heathrow Terminal 5 via Heathrow Central and Rickmansworth station from stop 2.

Future developments

Watford Junction station area improvements
There are plans to upgrade the station and its access points. The scheme includes a new multi-storey car park and a new access road to the station, connecting the A412 to Colonial Way and thus to the A4008 M1 link road.

This scheme is currently in the Pre-Qualification pool, where to achieve funding a case for selection must be submitted and if successful the Watford Station redevelopments will be moved into the Development Pool where more than 24 transport projects will compete for about £600 million.

Croxley Rail Link

A proposal called the Croxley Rail Link - later the Metropolitan Line Extension - would have diverted the Metropolitan line's  branch via the disused Croxley Green branch to terminate at Watford Junction. It was expected to open to passenger service in 2020, but due to funding issues, the project has been halted.

Proposed developments

West London Line improvement

Assuming the ongoing increase in demand on the orbital route between Watford Junction and the West London Line, a significant increase of peak capacity services is needed, as the current service forms the only link between the Watford Junction and Kensington Olympia corridors. This proposal suggests increasing West London Line – Watford Junction/Milton Keynes Central peak service to three tph and increasing present off peak services from an hour to every 30 minutes as well as suggesting extending Southern trains from 4 car to 8 car to help ease overcrowding further.

Crossrail

The 2011 London & South East Rail Utilisation Strategy also made recommendations for the Crossrail lines now under construction in central London to be extended northwards into Hertfordshire via Watford Junction, with Tring and Milton Keynes identified as potential termini. The report recommends the addition of a tunnel in the vicinity of a proposed station at  connecting the Crossrail route to the West Coast Main line. This proposal has not been officially confirmed or funded, although an announcement made in August 2014 by the transport secretary Patrick McLoughlin indicated that the government was actively evaluating the possibility of extending Crossrail as far as Tring and Milton Keynes Central.

London Euston/Watford-Aylesbury services
The rail operator Chiltern Railways proposed in 2008 that a new east–west direct rail route from Watford Junction to  could be operated via the new Croxley Rail Link and the northern section of the  London to Aylesbury Line. The proposal, or a connection from Aylesbury to London Euston, has been supported by the transport advocacy group Greengauge 21.

Watford to St Albans Busway (Abbey Busway)
A Draft Rail Strategy consultation published by Hertfordshire County Council in June 2015 again considered light rail proposals for the Abbey Line but also recommended that the railway track be removed and replaced with a guided busway.

See also
  Underground station (Metropolitan line)
  (Watford DC Line)
 St Albans Branch Line
 West Coast Main Line route modernisation

References

Sources

Further reading

External links

 
 
 
 
 

Railway stations in Watford
DfT Category B stations
Former London and North Western Railway stations
Railway stations in Great Britain opened in 1858
Railway stations served by Caledonian Sleeper
Railway stations served by West Midlands Trains
Railway stations served by London Overground
Railway stations served by Govia Thameslink Railway
Railway stations served by Avanti West Coast
Proposed London Underground stations
Croxley Rail Link
John William Livock buildings
Stations on the West Coast Main Line